Close Enough for Love is a 1979 studio album by jazz singer Peggy Lee.

The album was Lee's first recording in the United States since her 1975 album Mirrors. The album was Lee's only recording for DRG Records, and featured Lee with her regular quartet.

Reception

Reviewing the album for AllMusic, JT Griffith said that "Peggy Lee's voice sounds a bit depressed on this album, indicating, perhaps, an unfamiliarity with the new musical trappings. But that quality also gives the album's more straightforward numbers, like "Rain Sometimes" and "Come in From the Rain" (sounding like Wings), a moving, somber tone. An example of a dated album, but one that is a ripe for a rediscovery."

Track listing
 "You" (Tom Snow) – 4:04
 "Easy Does It" (Richard P. Hazard, Peggy Lee) – 3:28
 "Close Enough for Love" (Johnny Mandel, Paul Williams) – 3:55
 "A Robinsong" (Michael Franks) – 3:18
 "Just One of Those Things" (Cole Porter) – 2:48
 "I Can't Resist You" (Walter Donaldson, Will Donaldson, Ned Wever) – 4:33
 "Come in from the Rain" (Melissa Manchester, Carole Bayer Sager) – 3:07
 "In the Days of Our Love" (Lee, Marian McPartland) – 3:18
 "Through the Eyes of Love" (Marvin Hamlisch, Sager) – 3:11
 "Rain Sometimes" (Arthur Hamilton) – 3:55

Personnel
Performance
Peggy Lee – vocals
Ian Underwood – Keyboards
Max Bennett – bass
Dennis Budimir, John Chiodini, John Pisano – guitar
John Guerin – percussion, drums
Production
Hans Alvers – photography
Tchad Blake – engineer, assistant engineer
Sibbi Chalawick – art direction
Hugh Fordin – producer
Will Friedwald – liner notes
LuAnn Graffeo – art direction
Geoff Howe – engineer, mixing, mixing engineer
Richard Hazard – arranger, conductor
Dan O'Leary – reissue producer
Van-John Sfiridis – production supervisor
Alan Silverman – remastering

References

1979 albums
Albums arranged by Richard Hazard
Albums conducted by Richard Hazard
Peggy Lee albums